Mistress of the Seas is a 1964 novel by John Carlova based on the life of pirate Anne Bonny.

Background
In 1952 Carlova was researching another project at the British Museum when he read about Anne Bonny. He later researched Bonny's life in the West Indies and tried to sell the idea of a book on her to publishers but none were interested. A magazine expressed interest in a shorter version, and Carlova wrote an 80,000 word piece. However, the magazine only wanted a short article, which Carlova wrote. In 1962 a publisher's representative read the article in a magazine in a barber and became excited about the possibilities of the story as a book, "a kind of seagoing Forever Amber." He asked Carlova if he was interested in adapting it and Carlova submitted the 80,000 word manuscript. It was accepted for publication by Citadel Press.

Film Adaptation
A number of attempts were made to turn the book into a film, including:
In 1978 Tony Williams of the Rank Organisation announced Rank would make a film based on the novel.
In 1981 Bo Derek was attached to star in a version of the novel directed by her husband John Derek.
In the early 1990s Paul Verhoeven was going to direct a film version starring Geena Davis.

References

1964 American novels
American historical novels
American adventure novels
Novels about pirates
Cultural depictions of Anne Bonny